{{Infobox person
| name                    = Peter Fisher
| image                   = 
| caption                 = 'Peter Fisher is an Australian film and television actor who was most active in the period from the mid-1970s to the late-1990s. In the early 1990s he started to move into the area of corporate communications. In 1995 he created "Act One!" (Act One Theatre based Learning Pty Ltd) in Sydney, a company that specialises in corporate training and development. In the early 2000s he became involved with The University of New South Wales' Australian Graduate School of Management, particularly the Middle Manager Program
| birth_name               = 
| birth_date               = 
| birth_place              = Katoomba, New South Wales, Australia
| death_date               = 
| death_place              = 
| restingplace            = 
| restingplacecoordinates = 
| othername               = 
| occupation              = Television actor, corporate trainer
| yearsactive             = Acting: 1972–1994Corporate training: 1994–present
| spouse                  = 
| domesticpartner         = 
| children                = 
| website                 = www.peterf.com.au
}}Peter Fisher' (born 29 March 1954) is an Australian film and television actor who was most active in the period from the mid-1970s to the late-1990s. In the early 1990s he started to move into the area of corporate communications. In 1995 he created "Act One!"'' (Act One Theatre based Learning Pty Ltd) in Sydney, a company that specialises in corporate training and development. In the early 2000s he became involved with The University of New South Wales' Australian Graduate School of Management, particularly the Middle Manager Program.

Born in Katoomba, New South Wales, he studied architecture at Sydney University, graduating in 1974.

Filmography

Footnotes

External links

CV, Mark Morrissey & Associates

1954 births
Australian male film actors
Australian male television actors
Living people
Male actors from New South Wales